Ophiusa mejanesi is a moth of the family Erebidae first described by Achille Guenée in 1852. It is found in Africa, including Senegal and South Africa.

References

Ophiusa
Lepidoptera of West Africa
Lepidoptera of the Democratic Republic of the Congo
Lepidoptera of Malawi
Insects of West Africa
Insects of the Arabian Peninsula
Moths of Africa
Moths described in 1852